The Purple Line is a  light rail line being built to link several Maryland suburbs of Washington, D.C.: Bethesda, Silver Spring, College Park, and New Carrollton. Slated to open in 2026, the line will also enable riders to move between the Maryland branches of the Red, Green, Yellow, and Orange lines of the Washington Metro without riding into central Washington, and between all three lines of the MARC commuter rail system. The project is administered by the Maryland Transit Administration (MTA), an agency of the Maryland Department of Transportation (MDOT), and not the Washington Metropolitan Area Transit Authority (WMATA), which operates Metro.

Throughout its decades-long planning process, the project was dogged by resistance, particularly from residents of the upscale community of Chevy Chase. From 2003 to 2006, Maryland Governor Robert Ehrlich changed the proposed mode of transportation from light rail to bus rapid transit. Legal attempts to thwart the line continued even after construction had begun; but in December 2017, the U.S. Court of Appeals for the D.C. Circuit ruled that Purple Line construction could continue despite these objections.

In 2016, a consortium headed by Fluor Enterprises won the contract to design and build the Purple Line, then to operate and maintain it for 36 years. Construction began in August 2017. Work halted in September 2020, when the consortium withdrew from the contract, citing mounting delays and disputes with the state government. The project had already consumed $1.1 billion of the anticipated $2 billion construction cost.

A new general contractor was selected in November 2021 and a new contract was signed in April 2022. This new agreement added $3.7 billion to the total cost of building, running, and maintaining the Purple Line for 30 years, bringing it to $9.3 billion. Construction costs alone rose $1.46 billion, bringing the total to $3.4 billion.

Full-scale construction activity resumed in summer 2022. Train service is scheduled to begin in fall 2026.

History

Early studies, public debate, design

The "Purple Line" has been the name of two different transit proposals. In 1994, John J. Corley Jr., an architect with Harry Weese Associates (which designed the Washington Metro system) proposed a multibillion-dollar Metro line around the  Capital Beltway. This would have served as a "ring" line, connecting suburb to suburb and complementing the existing Metro lines, which radiate from Washington. (See Rapid transit#Network topologies.) In 1998, the Beltway Purple Line received considerable political support from Montgomery County Executive Douglas M. Duncan and Governor Parris Glendening, which was a $10 billion,  line from National Harbor to Montgomery Mall.

In 1987, after CSX expressed a desire to abandon the Georgetown Branch rail line, Maryland leaders immediately started planning to repurpose it for transit and a hiking trail. The idea of adapting the railroad for a transit line dated back at least as far as 1970, when such a use was included in the October 1970 Master Plan for the Bethesda-Chevy Chase Planning Area. Montgomery County purchased its portion of the railroad right-of-way from CSX in 1988 and in 1989 budgeted $107 million to build a trolley between Bethesda and Silver Spring and a pair of trails between Silver Spring and the District.

Eventually, this proposal came known as the "Inner Purple Line" to distinguish it from the "Beltway Purple Line". By 2001, the "Beltway Purple Line" proposal had been abandoned as too costly and the name was attached to the Bethesda to  line.

Robert Flanagan, the Maryland State Secretary of Transportation under Governor Robert Ehrlich, merged the Purple Line proposal with the Georgetown Branch Light Rail Transit (GBLRT) line.

In March 2003, the Ehrlich administration renamed the project the "Bi-County Transitway", reflecting a proposal by Ehrlich and Flanagan to use bus rapid transit instead of light rail, and because the name "Purple Line" seemed to suggest a new heavy-rail system like the color-named lines of the Washington Metro system. The new name did not catch on; several media outlets and most citizens continued to refer to the "Purple Line". In 2007, Governor Martin O'Malley and Secretary of Transportation John Porcari reverted to "Purple Line".

In January 2008, the O'Malley administration allocated $100 million within a six-year capital budget to complete design documents for state approval and funding of the Purple Line. In May 2008, it was projected that the Purple Line would have about 68,000 daily trips. A draft environmental impact study was issued on October 20, 2008. On December 22, 2008, Montgomery County planners endorsed building a light rail line rather than a bus line. On January 15, 2009, the county planning board also endorsed the light rail option, and County Executive Isiah Leggett has also expressed support. On October 21, 2009, members of the National Capital Region Transportation Planning Board voted unanimously to approve the Purple Line light rail project for inclusion into the region's Constrained Long-Range Transportation Plan.

Planners proposed to use existing Washington Metro stations and to accept the WMATA's SmarTrip farecard. Metro's 2008 annual report envisioned that the Purple Line would be fully integrated with the existing Washington Metro transit system by 2030.

The proposed project drew support and opposition in the community:

Support for Purple Line
 Purple Line Now is a non-profit organization that advocated for a Purple Line light rail line from Bethesda to New Carrollton to be integrated with a hiker/biker trail from Bethesda to Silver Spring.
 The Action Committee for Transit is a community group that supports the Purple Line.
 The Washington Post editorial board endorsed the Purple Line light rail option in 2008.
 The Montgomery County Council and Prince George's County Council voted unanimously in favor of the light rail option for the Purple Line in January 2009.
 Maryland state officials (including former Governor Martin O'Malley) are also strong Purple Line advocates. State officials say that a Purple Line, which is to run primarily above ground, "would provide better east–west transit service, particularly for lower-income workers who cannot afford cars."
 The development firm Chevy Chase Land Co. is a strong proponent of the construction of the Purple Line. The website for the pro-Purple umbrella group Purple Line NOW! lists Edward Asher as a member of its board of directors. The Washington Post stated that the development firm would "no doubt profit from property it owns near at least one of the proposed stations."
 The Sierra Club advocates a larger-scale rail system to parallel the Capital Beltway and link all existing Metro lines at their peripheries. This environmental group advocates rail transit over car use because carbon emissions are a major cause of climate change.
 Some student leaders (the Student Government Association and Graduate Student Government) at the University of Maryland support transit alternatives to campus.
 On January 27, 2009, the Montgomery County Council voted to support the light rail option. Governor O'Malley announced his own approval on August 4, 2009.
 The vice president of trail development for the Rails-to-Trails Conservancy has said that with proper design, the trail-Purple Line combination can be "among the best in the nation."
Members of the Facebook group New Urbanist Memes for Transit-Oriented Teens were "irrationally excited for the forthcoming Maryland purple line."

Support for bus
 A 2008 study by Sam Schwartz Engineering for the Town of Chevy Chase supported bus rapid transit using an alternate Jones Bridge Road alignment. The Chevy Chase study expressed concerns about the expected ridership numbers, carbon footprint, interruptions in recreation pathways, and the cost of bus and light rail proposals by the MTA involving a Capital Crescent Trail alignment. Although a Jones Bridge Road alignment was also proposed by the MTA, the study noted that features typical of bus rapid transit that were missing from the MTA proposal.

Opposition to rail

 A not-for-profit local organization, Friends of the Capital Crescent Trail, began collecting signatures on a petition opposing the MTA's Purple Line proposals in 2003; in 2014, it filed a lawsuit in the U.S. District Court in the District of Columbia asserting that the Federal Transit Administration had not complied with federal environmental laws when it approved a grant to help build the Purple Line. In 2008, the organization's website asserted that the MTA's light rail and bus rapid transit proposals would undermine the environment and safety on the Capital Crescent Trail, and endorsed running bus rapid transit on Jones Bridge Road, as recommended by the Chevy Chase study. But the petition called for yet a different option because the Jones Bridge Road route would affect the trail.
 A leading opponent of the Purple Line was the Columbia Country Club, a private club whose golf course occupies both sides of the planned route between Bethesda and Silver Spring.
 Opponents in the Town of Chevy Chase cited the town's study of bus rapid transit alternatives. The study estimated a cost of less than $1 billion for a bus rapid transit system, compared with an estimated cost of $1.8 billion for light rail.
 In 2010, residents around the Dale Wayne stop worried that doubling the size of the road, along with the county's "smart growth" policy around transit stops, would encourage commercial development in a residential neighborhood. They wondered about the accuracy of the MTA's prediction that the Dale station would see 1,427 daily boardings.

Procurement
The Purple Line was procured as a full design-build-finance-operate-maintain public–private partnership. On December 7, 2015, four teams composed of major American and international firms submitted their bids to realize the project:
 "Maryland Purple Line Partners" composed of Vinci Concessions, Walsh Investors, InfraRed Capital, Alstom and Keolis
 "Maryland Transit Connectors" composed of John Laing Investments, Kiewit Development Company, Edgemoor Infrastructure & Real Estate and RATP Dev
 "Purple Line Transit Partners" composed of Meridiam, Fluor Corporation, Star America, CAF and Alternate Concepts
 "Purple Plus Alliance" composed of Macquarie Capital Group, Skanska, Kinki Sharyo and Transdev.

Approval

Governor Larry Hogan opposed the Purple Line project while campaigning in 2014 but approved it in June 2015. At the same time, Hogan cancelled its sister project, the Baltimore Red Line, citing excessive costs. Hogan reduced the state's contribution to the project from $700 million to $168 million, putting the difference toward highway construction. The budget shortfall is expected to be covered by increased funds from Prince George's and Montgomery counties, as well as lower operational costs due to longer headways.

On March 2, 2016, Hogan announced that the state had chosen a team of private companies to build, operate, and maintain the Purple Line for $3.3 billion over 36 years. The contract was won by the Purple Line Transit Partners, led by construction giant Fluor Corporation. MTA officials forecasted that service would begin by late 2022.

On April 6, 2016, the Maryland Board of Public Works (composed of Hogan, State Treasurer Nancy K. Kopp, and State Comptroller Peter Franchot) unanimously approved the contract, as expected. The $5.6 billion contract is 876 pages long and, according to The Washington Post is "believed to be the most expensive government contract ever in Maryland" and "one of the largest public-private partnerships on a U.S. transportation project" ever. The contract approval allowed the MTA to finalize $900 million in federal construction grants.

In August 2016, U.S. District Court Judge Richard J. Leon found that the MTA and the Federal Transit Administration did not study whether Metro's maintenance issues and ridership decline would affect the Purple Line. Judge Leon decided to vacate the Purple Line's federal approval. A federal funding agreement cannot be signed without the reinstatement of the environmental approval, and Maryland had said it could not afford to build the Purple Line without sufficient federal funding. On August 21, 2017, despite the ongoing court case over the environmental analysis, $900 million of federal funding was granted for the light rail project. On December 19, 2017, the U.S. Court of Appeals for the D.C. Circuit ruled in favor of the Purple Line, specifically stating that declining ridership on the Washington Metro system does not require Maryland to complete a new environmental study for the Purple Line. This federal appeals court ruling allowed for construction to continue and effectively ended the three-year legal battle surrounding the light-rail line project.

In 2019, the Purple Line Transit Partners said the opening date would slip to 2023 or 2024.

On April 13, 2020, U.S. District Judge James Bredar dismissed the third and final lawsuit brought by opponents of the Purple Line.

Builder consortium quits
By 2020, the project had accrued over $800 million in change orders from Purple Line Transit Partners and the opening date had slipped 32 months. On May 1, the consortium declared their intent to cease work on the line and withdraw from their contract. A temporary restraining order halted the company from quitting work, but it was lifted in September, and PLTP began packing up construction sites the following week. In November, MDOT announced that MTA had assumed many of the Purple Line's contracts, including the manufacturing of light-rail cars, operations, and maintenance, as well as design and construction contracts. On November 24, MDOT agreed to pay $250 million to settle the costs of overruns that caused the contractor to quit and to resume construction of the Purple Line. In mid-December, Maryland's Board of Public Works (BPW) unanimously approved the $250 million legal settlement to PLTP to resolve the contract disputes. Officials aimed to restart construction within nine months.

New contractor selected
On November 5, 2021, Purple Line officials announced that Maryland Transit Solutions would receive the contract to finish construction and operate the line. The BPW approved the $3.4 billion contract on January 26, 2022. 

In June 2022, MTA said that 77% of the necessary utility relocations had been completed, and that the Glenridge Operations and Maintenance Facility was complete and in operation. Extensive construction activity resumed in summer 2022.

MTA expects the line to open in fall 2026.

Route and station locations

The planned rail line will connect the existing Metro, MARC commuter rail, and Amtrak stations at:
  (Metro Red Line)
  (Metro Red Line, MARC Brunswick Line)
  (Metro Green Line, Metro Yellow Line, MARC Camden Line)
  (Metro Orange Line, MARC Penn Line, Amtrak Northeast Regional, Amtrak Vermonter)

The following stations are part of the "Locally Preferred Alternative" route approved by Governor Martin O'Malley on August 9, 2009:

Potential expansion
Although the Purple Line is usually described as a 16-mile east–west line between Bethesda and New Carrollton, there have been several proposals to expand the line further into Maryland or to mirror the Capital Beltway as a loop around the Washington, D.C., metropolitan area. The Sierra Club has argued for a Purple Line that would "encircle Washington, D.C." and "connect existing suburban metro lines." Maryland Lieutenant Governor Anthony Brown, while campaigning in 2006, similarly stated that he would "like to see the Purple Line go from Bethesda to across the Woodrow Wilson Bridge," adding, "Let's swing that boy all the way around" (a reference to having the Purple Line circle through Virginia and back to the line's point of origin in Bethesda).

An advocacy group known as "The Inner Purple Line Campaign" proposed that the Purple Line be extended westward to Tysons Corner and eastward to Largo, and that it could eventually cross the new Wilson Bridge from Suitland through Oxon Hill to Alexandria, eventually forming a rail line that encircles the city. The new Woodrow Wilson Bridge (I-495's southern crossing over the Potomac River) is built to carry a heavy or light rail line. Suggested stops along this proposed Purple Line expansion include:
 
 
 Oxon Hill (potentially near Rosecroft Raceway, at which Metro has at times had plans to build a stop since 1980)
 National Harbor
 Alexandria, potentially the  Metro station
 Springfield
 Annandale
 
 Tysons Corner

Rolling stock
The light rail vehicles designed to run on the Purple Line are being built by CAF at their Elmira, New York, facility. CAF began testing the cars in 2020. Fabrication of all 130 modular car shells at the CAF facility in Spain was completed in June 2021. 22 of the 26 trains have been assembled as of June 2022.

See also

 Southern Maryland Rapid Transit
 Silver Line (Washington Metro)
 Talbot Avenue bridge

References

External links

Purple Line Montgomery County Planning Department

 
Transportation in Montgomery County, Maryland
Transportation in Prince George's County, Maryland
Light rail in Maryland
Streetcars in Maryland
Proposed public transportation in Maryland
Maryland Transit Administration
Buildings and structures under construction in the United States
Tram and light rail transit systems under construction
1500 V DC railway electrification
Proposed railway lines in Maryland
2026 in rail transport